Flavonoid 4'-O-methyltransferase (SOMT-2, 4'-hydroxyisoflavone methyltransferase) is an enzyme with systematic name S-adenosyl-L-methionine:flavonoid 4'-O-methyltransferase. This enzyme catalyses the following chemical reaction

 S-adenosyl-L-methionine + 4'-hydroxyflavanone  S-adenosyl-L-homocysteine + 4'-methoxyflavanone

The enzyme catalyses the 4'-methylation of naringenin.

References

External links 
 

EC 2.1.1